Robert Bell Conroy (20 June 1929 – 1978) was a Scottish footballer who played as full back for Bury and Tranmere Rovers.

References

1929 births
1978 deaths
Sportspeople from Kirkintilloch
Association football fullbacks
Scottish footballers
Ashfield F.C. players
Bury F.C. players
Tranmere Rovers F.C. players
English Football League players